Rick Founds is Christian singer songwriter based in Fallbrook, California. He is best known for writing "Lord, I Lift Your Name on High". Other titles that he has authored include "I Love Your Grace", "Jesus, Mighty God", "I Need You" and "Jesus, Draw Me Close".   

Since the 1990s, "Lord, I Lift Your Name on High" has been one of the most popular Christian songs and subject of many cover versions and translated into many languages. In the United States Christian Copyright Licensing International (CCLI) reported it as the most popular song used in Christian evangelical churches every year from 1997 to 2003, and since then has remained in the Top 10 list.

Discography

Albums
2004: After All
2004: Everybody Praise Him!
2004: Carry Me Away
2007: Al Final
2007: Global Textures
2008: Tranquil Tunes
2009: Praise Classics 1 & 2
2009: Christmas Jazz

References

External links
Official website

Christian music songwriters
American performers of Christian music
Living people
Musicians from California
Place of birth missing (living people)
Year of birth missing (living people)
People from Fallbrook, California